The Hanomag 2/10 PS is an economy car manufactured by Hanomag from 1924 until 1928. It was one of the first cars with envelope styling. It was affectionately referred to as the Kommissbrot ("Army Bread") due to its identical shape with the usual loaf of bread used by the German army at the time. "Kommiss" is German slang for "Army", short for "commissioned."

 
The 2/10 PS (two taxable / ten brake horsepower) had a single-cylinder half litre engine behind the passengers. The rear axle was chain-driven, with no differential. With a fuel consumption of  it was the world's most fuel efficient mass-production car between the two World Wars due to the low-friction one-cylinder engine and its very light weight.

The fenders, or wings, of the 2/10 PS were integrated into the bodywork of the car, allowing the passenger space to be wider than it would have been with the traditional separate fenders and running board. The compact drivetrain allowed the floor to be lower, removing the need for a running board. The rounded appearance of the 2/10 PS, due to the envelope styling, earned it the nickname Kommissbrot after the inexpensive, flat-sided bread typically used by the military.

The 2/10 PS faced competition from the Opel Laubfrosch and the Dixi DA1 variant of the Austin 7. These cars were superior by nearly every measure and cost no more than the little Hanomag; the Kommissbrot was replaced in 1928 by the more conventional 3/16 PS model.

References

Cars of Germany
First car made by manufacturer
Cars introduced in 1925
Rear_mid-engine,_rear-wheel-drive_vehicles